William Herrmann may refer to:

William Herrmann (gymnast) (1912–2003), American gymnast
Wilhelm Herrmann (1846–1922), Reformed German theologian